The 27th Army Corps was an Army corps in the Imperial Russian Army.

Part of
2nd Army: 1914
1st Army: 1915
2nd Army: 1915 - 1916
1st Army: 1916
12th Army: 1917
5th Army: 1917

Reference 

Corps of the Russian Empire